John Summers is a former Scottish international lawn and indoor bowler.

Bowls career
He won a silver medal in the triples, a silver medal in the fours and a bronze medal in the team event (Leonard Trophy) at the 1980 World Outdoor Bowls Championship in Melbourne.

Coaching
Summers was appointed East of Scotland Regional coach in 1988 and elected manager of the Scottish Indoor International Team from 1989-2000. He was inducted into the Scottish Indoor Bowling Association's Hall of Fame in 2018.

Personal life
He started bowling in 1967 after moving to Balerno with his wife and daughter from Strathaven, Lanarkshire.

References

Living people
Scottish male bowls players
Year of birth missing (living people)